The Association for Consciousness Exploration LLC (ACE) is an American organization based in Northeastern Ohio which produces events, books, and recorded media in the fields of "magic, mind-sciences, alternative lifestyles, comparative religion/spirituality, entertainment, holistic healing, and related subjects."

History 
The organization was founded in 1983 by members of the Chameleon Club (founded in 1978), and their fictional founder, C. C. Rosencomet, on the campus of Case Western Reserve University in Cleveland, Ohio. Its primary directors were Jeff Rosenbaum (now deceased) and Joseph Rothenberg, and many of the founding members still make up much of the core organizing group.

As a campus organization they offered concerts by local musicians, offered a film series, and hosted appearances by Jim Alan and Selena Fox of Circle Sanctuary, Raymond Buckland, and the first Cleveland appearance of Timothy Leary (at Amasa Stone Chapel).

In the 1980s, they also ran a "mind spa", providing hands-on experience with mind machines, biofeedback devices, and a sensory isolation tank.

The motto of the Chameleon Club is "CHANGE", and ACE's is "Dedicated to the Expansion of the Frontiers of Your Consideration". ACE was originally located at The Civic, a former synagogue in Cleveland Heights, Ohio, and there offered classes and featured appearances of Robert Anton Wilson, Timothy Leary, Robin Williamson, and Selena Fox.

Activities and functions 
ACE maintains the Starwood Center, a workshop/seminar/bookstore facility in Cleveland, Ohio. The first two DEVOtionals, an annual event run by fans of the band Devo, were held at the Starwood Center in 2000 and 2001.

ACE hosts the annual Starwood Festival, a summer camping event held in July featuring live entertainment and classes on a variety of subjects including Neopaganism, eclectic spirituality, consciousness, and holistic health, and the annual WinterStar Symposium, usually held in February.

ACE produces and sells books, tapes, CDs and DVDs documenting performances, lectures and panel discussions from their events.

See also
John C. Lilly

References

Citations

Works cited

External links
rosencomet.com - the Association for Consciousness Exploration website

Modern pagan organizations based in the United States
Modern pagan organizations established in the 1980s
Religious organizations established in 1983